Hans Teodor Deutgen (born 28 February 1917 in Stockholm, Sweden; died 3 October 1989) was a World Champion archer who represented Sweden.

Deutgen remains the most successful male archer of all time at the World Archery Championships, winning the championship on four consecutive occasions between 1947 and 1950, before the event became biennial. Upon being presented with his fourth gold in 1950, he passed it to third place Russ Reynolds, who was suffering from leukemia. Deutgen retired from competition in 1953.

References

Swedish male archers
1917 births
1989 deaths
World Archery Championships medalists
Sportspeople from Stockholm
20th-century Swedish people